Animal Headdress, (fl. c. 292) was ajaw ("lord") of the Maya city-state of Tikal. He was father of his successor Sihyaj Chan K'awiil I and husband of Lady Skull.

Notes

Footnotes

References

Rulers of Tikal
3rd century in the Maya civilization
3rd-century monarchs in North America